The Pont–Brassus Railway (PBr) was a railway company in the Swiss canton of Vaud. It built a standard gauge line from Le Pont parallel to the north shore of the Lac de Joux to Le Brassus. The line has been owned by the Travys regional transport company since 2001. Passenger traffic on the line is operated by Swiss Federal Railways (SBB). Trains run continuously from Vallorbe via Le Pont to Le Brassus. They operate hourly on non school days and half-hourly on school days.

History

In response to a petition from the residents of the valleys in 1867, a tunnel was built through the Mont d'Orzeires, which had a dual purpose, on the one hand it would serve the railway, and on the other hand, it would channel floodwater from the valley during an extraordinary flood. Lake Brenet used to drain naturally underground, although it now operates as a hydroelectric reservoir.

The Pont–Vallorbe Railway (Chemin de fer Pont–Vallorbe; PV) opened the railway line between Vallorbe and Le Pont on 31 October 1886. As a result, the PBr was founded to extend the branch line further into the Vallée de Joux. Traffic between Le Pont and Le Brassus was started on 21 August 1899. The PBr had only passenger cars and freight wagons, but none of its own locomotives. So operations were carried out from the beginning by the JS and after its nationalisation on 1 May 1903 by the SBB.
 
The economic crisis of the 1930s led to a marked decline in freight and passenger traffic; operations with steam locomotives proved to be too unprofitable. For this reason, electrification was approved and was completed on 1 October 1938. Operating costs would be significantly reduced as a result. As the line continued to be managed by the SBB, the use of its power system was adopted.
 
Frequencies of passenger services declined markedly in the 1980s, not least because of the poor timetable. Therefore, the track has been fundamentally modernised and a new timetable concept with modern rolling stock (SBB RBDe 4/4) has been introduced.
 
The PBr was absorbed into a new company, Travys on 1 January 2001.
 
In 2008, the terminal station in Le Brassus was relocated during station modernisation by about 100 metres towards Le Pont. This shortened the total length of the line from 24.55 km to 24.46 km.

Rolling stock

 Historic passenger cars
 BC 11 (1875), acquired by SBB in 1914 (NOB BC 846, SBB BC 4296), abandoned in 1938
 C 21–22 (1899), sold to SBB for demolition in 1952
 BC4 65 (1950), from 1956 AB4 65, from 1963 ABi 65, from 1970 Bi 475, since 1984 in the CTVJ (No. 4420 red)
 C4 476 (1950), from 1956 C4 476, from 1963 B4 476, from 1970 Bi 4756, Since 1993 with CTVJ (No. 7476 brown)
 B 477 (1939), acquired by SBB in 1984 (B 50 85 23-33 008-8)

Notes

Footnotes

References

 

Defunct railway companies of Switzerland
1899 establishments in Switzerland
2001 disestablishments in Switzerland